KBGO (95.7 FM) is a radio station broadcasting a classic hits format. Licensed to Waco, Texas, United States, the station serves the Waco area.  The station is currently owned by iHeartMedia, Inc. and features programming from Premiere Radio Networks.  Its studios and transmitter are co-located on Highway 6 in Waco.

History
The station went on the air as KEFC (FM) on September 6, 1959. Studios and tower were at "The Market Place" strip shopping center in the 4700 block of Bosque Blvd. Power was 3,100 watts at 220 feet on 95.5.

Calls changed to KNFO-FM on September 11, 1980.  On July 26, 1993, the station changed its call sign to KCKR, and on February 25, 2003, to the current KBGO.

The sign-on signal was basically that of a class A even though the channel was eligible for use by bigger class C signals. KEFC Waco was short to 95.5 KAZZ (later KOKE-FM) in Austin. In late 70s/early 80s Waco and Austin built new sites with powers of 100,000 watts on thousand foot towers. Both stations used directional antennas to protect the other.

By the late nineties the two signals were co-owned. The then KKMJ Austin went non directional, allowing coverage of the growing Austin suburbs. Waco dropped to a class C2, moved to a tower at their Waco studios, with 24,000 watts at 470 feet on 95.7.

References

External links

BGO
Radio stations established in 1980
Classic hits radio stations in the United States
IHeartMedia radio stations